Proleptomonas is a genus of coprophilic protists, containing the single species Proleptomonas faecicola. It belongs to the phylum Cercozoa, although it was previously considered the only free-living kinetoplastid. It is the only member of family Proleptomonadidae.

References

External links

Cercozoa genera
Taxa described in 1916